Bruno Alexandre Rodrigues, or simply Bruno (born February 6, 1989 in São Paulo), is a Brazilian footballer who plays as a striker.

Club statistics

References

External links

1989 births
Living people
Brazilian footballers
Brazilian expatriate footballers
J2 League players
Ventforet Kofu players
Gainare Tottori players
América Futebol Clube (SP) players
Marília Atlético Clube players
Clube Esportivo Lajeadense players
Sociedade Esportiva Palmeiras players
São José Esporte Clube players
Sport Club Atibaia players
Esporte Clube Noroeste players
Rio Preto Esporte Clube players
Association football forwards
Brazilian expatriate sportspeople in Japan
Brazilian expatriate sportspeople in Portugal
Expatriate footballers in Japan
Expatriate footballers in Portugal
Footballers from São Paulo (state)